Senad Hadžimusić-Teno is a Bosnian musician, songwriter and poet best known as the founder, mastermind, songwriter, producer, singer and guitarist of the Sarajevo alternative rock band SCH. With SCH, his band-alterego, Teno has authored, performed, produced and recorded 12 official albums. His music was also featured in a number of films and radio programs, as well as in the theater.

Numerous articles, essays, and reviews have been published about this extraordinary and significant figure of the Bosnian and Ex-Yugoslavian alternative culture.

In 1996 in Prague, Senad Hadžimusić also published the bilingual (English/Bosnian) lyrics book "SCH - Songs and Tales", which was highly acclaimed by well-known Bosnian and Croatian writer, poet, journalist and literary critic Miljenko Jergović.

References

External links
Facebook
Interview for CARPE DIEM RECORDS, December 2003

Living people
Bosniaks of Bosnia and Herzegovina
Bosniak poets
Noise musicians
Industrial musicians
Bosnia and Herzegovina songwriters
Yugoslav musicians
Musicians from Sarajevo
Year of birth missing (living people)